The United States Marine Corps requires that all Marines perform a Physical Fitness Test (PFT) and a Combat Fitness Test  (CFT) once each calendar year. Each test must be held at an interval of six months. The same standards apply for reservists. The PFT ensures that Marines are keeping physically fit and in a state of physical readiness. It consists of pull-ups or push-ups, planks, and a 3-mile run.

On October 1, 2008, the Marine Corps introduced the additional pass/fail CFT to the fitness requirements. The CFT is designed to measure abilities demanded of Marines in a war zone.

Tests

Pull-ups or push-ups
For this test, Marines choose to either perform pull-ups or push-ups. However, the maximum score is only attainable if pull-ups are chosen.

The pull-ups may be done with either an overhand (pronated) grip or an underhand (supinated) "chin-up" grip. Changes in grip are allowed as long as the feet do not touch the ground and only the hands come in contact with the pull-up bar. The pull-up begins at the "dead-hang" with arms extended and the body hanging motionless. A successful pull-up is performed without excess motion, the body rising until the chin is above the bar, and body lowered back to the "dead-hang" position. There is no time limit.

Until 2017, male Marines were required to perform pull-ups, and female Marines performed the flexed hang instead of the pull-up. The flexed hang was started with the chin above the pull-up bar. The timer was started and did not stop until the arms became fully extended. The feet could not touch the ground or any part of the pull-up bar at any time. The Marine Corps had originally indicated that, as of January 1, 2014, female Marines would be required to perform a minimum of three pull-ups in order to pass the PFT. However, when more than half of female recruits were unable to meet this standard, the change was delayed. In 2017, the flexed-arm hang event was eliminated, and both male and female Marines were given the choice to do either push-ups or pull-ups for this event.

Planks
Planks are executed with forearms on the deck with hands and feet placed shoulder width apart. The body must remain flat and parallel to the deck. The Marine must hold this position as long as possible with no pauses. Marines must achieve a duration 3:45 to for a maximum score.

Run
The Marine runs three miles on reasonably flat ground. (Actual distance may vary slightly.) The 3.1 miles is approximately 5 kilometers.

Scoring
The scoring for each part of the test is dependent upon a Marine's sex and age group.

References

External links
USMC PFT Calculator
CFTcalculator.com
Official Scoring Charts from Marines.mil

United States Marine Corps
Fitness tests
Long-distance running